De cap tà l'immortèla (To the Edelweiss), or simply L'immortèla (The Edelweiss) is a song by Nadau, an Occitan-speaking band from Béarn. It was composed in 1978 and has since grown so popular all across Occitania it is sometimes thought to be traditional folklore, just like Se Canta or Copa Santa. It is a hymn to freedom and the love for the motherland. L'immortèla, besides referring to the white flower with a yellow heart found only in the high mountains, means "the immortal one".

Lyrics

External links
 Live version
 Nadau's official site

Patriotic songs
Songs about flowers
Occitan music
1978 songs

ca:L'immortèla